The Curtiss CT-1 model 24, a twin engine torpedo bomber mounted on floats, was first flown in 1921.

Development
The US Navy was looking for a new torpedo bomber following a demonstration of sinking a battleship with an aircraft. A specification was announced requiring a twin floatplane that could be sled launched and crane recovered at sea. Prototypes of the Curtiss CT-1, Stout ST-1, Fokker FT-1 and Blackburn Swift F were evaluated at the Anacostia Naval Yard. Curtiss won an initial contract to build nine torpedo bombers on June 30, 1920, but the order was canceled and only one acceptance prototype was built. The aircraft was constructed in Rockaway, New York.

Design
The aircraft had twin booms, twin tails, twin floats and a single cockpit. A turret was placed high above and behind the pilot to have a full 360 degree firing arc. The thick airfoil wings were cantilevered without struts or wires using three spars. The fuselage was made of traditional welded tube frame with the-then new technology of an aluminum skin. The rest of the aircraft was of welded tube with a fabric covering. The engine nacelles were deeply recessed into the wings. Two under-wing Lamblin radiators provided cooling. Engine stands were located for mechanics to work on the aircraft. Single-engine operation resulted in a height loss of 100 ft per minute.

Operational history
The first water taxi tests were performed by Bert Acosta on 2 May 1921 at NAS Rockaway, resulting in larger rudders added for stability. The sheet metal formed motor mounts and tail structure required reinforcement. The engines overheated, and could only fly for 20 minutes at a time.

The aircraft was demonstrated to the US Navy at the Annacostia Naval Yard and at the war college at Fort McNair, Washington, D.C. The aircraft was given the serial number A-5890, and the navy designation CT-1, for "Curtiss" "Torpedo bomber (number one)"-"variant one".

Specifications Curtiss CT-1

See also

References

Notes

1920s United States bomber aircraft
Floatplanes
CT-1
Twin-boom aircraft
Low-wing aircraft
Aircraft first flown in 1921
Twin piston-engined tractor aircraft